Thallophyca is a non-mineralized Ediacarian alga that probably dwelt on the sea floor. Its thallus is differentiated into a cortex and a medulla. Possible reproductive structures have been identified.

References

Ediacaran life
Fossil algae
Fossil taxa described in 1989